| tries = {{#expr:
 5 + 6 + 12 + 4 + 5 + 6 + 8 + 10 
 + 5 + 9 + 7 + 10 + 6 + 5 + 5 
 + 8 + 4 + 5 + 5 + 7 + 13 + 3 + 11 
 + 9 + 12 + 16 + 6 + 7 + 7 + 5 + 6 
 + 8 + 5 + 4 + 3 + 3 + 3 + 3 
 + 11 + 8 + 10 + 7 + 7 + 6 + 13 
 + 8 + 12 + 5 + 10 + 8 + 7 + 2 
 + 11 + 12 + 4 + 6 + 8 + 7 + 9
 + 8 + 14 + 3 + 8 + 4 + 7 + 6
 + 2 + 9 + 6
 + 8 + 12 + 8 + 4 + 9 + 9 + 10
  + 10 + 12 + 5 + 6 + 8 + 8 + 6 + 3
 + 8 + 4 + 12 + 4 + 4 
 + 9 + 4 + 4 + 4 + 3 + 6 + 8 + 4
 + 8 + 5 + 3 + 6 + 9 + 3 + 8 + 9 
 + 5 + 7 + 5 + 6  
 + 3 + 5 + 8 + 7 + 8 + 3 + 4 + 1  
 + 7 + 4 + 7 + 5 + 6 + 7 + 6 + 8
 + 6 + 6 + 5 + 3 + 10 + 8 + 12 + 7 
 +10 + 5 + 11 + 9 + 5 + 2 + 12 
 + 3 + 12 + 11 + 3 + 11
 + 7 + 3 + 7 + 4 + 5 + 7 + 4  
 + 7 + 9 + 6 + 2 + 4 + 14
 + 6 + 12 + 6 + 2 + 9 + 2 + 6 + 4
 + 7 + 18 + 5 + 9 + 4 + 5 + 14 + 12
 + 10 + 7 + 12 + 6 + 6 + 9 + 10 + 8
 + 8 + 12 + 4 + 13 + 5 + 8
 + 5 + 6 + 11 + 9 + 7 + 6 + 12 + 11
 + 9 + 8 + 9 + 3 + 5 + 10 + 7 + 10 
 + 11 + 11 + 11 + 9 + 4 + 10 + 11 + 9 
 + 7 + 10 + 8 + 10 + 8 + 7 + 9
 + 6 + 10 + 6 + 10 + 5 + 11 + 8 + 8 
 + 14 + 10 + 10 + 6 + 4 + 12 + 10 + 7 
 + 12 + 7
}}
| top point scorer = 278– Gregory Smith (Fylde)
| top try scorer   = 36 – Matthew Gallagher (Sedgley Park)
| prevseason       = 2019–20
| nextseason       = 2022–23
}}

The 2021–22 National League 2 North was the twelfth season (34th overall) of the fourth tier (north) of the English domestic rugby union competitions since the professionalised format of the second division was introduced.

Hull were crowned champions on 23 April 2022, when they played their last but one match of the season at home to local rivals Hull Ionians, beating them with a final minute try, 31–29 in front of a crowd of 950. Hull were promoted to National One for the 2022–23 seasom. Owing to the reorganisation of the national leagues, there was no play-off match and Sedgley Park continued to play at this level. Huddersfield (15th) and Harrogate (16th) also continued to play at this level, due to the increase of tier 4 leagues from two to three.

Structure
The league consists of sixteen teams with all the teams playing each other on a home and away basis to make a total of thirty matches each. There is one promotion place and owing to the reorganisation of tier three and four divisions, there is no relegation. The champions are promoted to  National League 1. 

The results of the matches contribute points to the league as follows:
 4 points are awarded for a win
 2 points are awarded for a draw
 0 points are awarded for a loss, however
 1 losing (bonus) point is awarded to a team that loses a match by 7 points or fewer
 1 additional (bonus) point is awarded to a team scoring 4 tries or more in a match.

Participating teams and locations
Eleven of the teams listed below participated in the 2019–20 National League 2 North season.  The 2019–20 champions, Caldy, were promoted to the 2021–22 National League 1, replacing Rotherham Titans and Hull Ionians who were relegated from the 2019–20 National League 1. The three teams relegated from National League 2 North the previous season were Otley and Preston Grasshoppers (both North Premier) and Scunthorpe (Midlands Premier). The promoted teams were Bournville (champions of Midlands Premier), while Blaydon and Harrogate came up as champions and runner-up of North Premier. In order to address an imbalance of teams, Hinckley were level transferred to the 2021–22 National League 2 South as the most appropriately located team in terms of access to the southern sides.

League table

Fixtures & results
Fixtures for the season were announced by the RFU on 4 May 2021.

Round 1

Round 2

Round 3

Round 4

Round 5

Round 6

Round 7

Round 8

Round 9

Rounds 2, 5 & 7 (rescheduled matches)

Round 10

Round 11

Round 12

Round 13

Round 14

Round 15

Round 16

Round 17

Round 18

Round 19

Rounds 6, 8, 9 & 12 (rescheduled matches)

Round 20

Round 21

Round 22

Round 23

Round 24

Rounds 10, 12, 15 & 21 (rescheduled matches)

Round 25

Round 26

Round 27

Round 28

Round 29

Round 30

Rescheduled matches

See also
 2021–22 National League 1
 2021–22 National League 2 South

Notes

References

External links
 NCA Rugby

2021–22
4N